Betis Deportivo Balompié is a Spanish football team based in Seville, in the autonomous community of Andalusia. Founded in 1942, it is the reserve team of Real Betis and currently plays in Segunda Federación, holding home games at Ciudad Deportiva Luis del Sol, with a capacity of 3,000 seats.

Unlike the English League, reserve teams in Spain play in the same football pyramid as their senior team, rather than a separate league. However, reserve teams cannot play in the same division as the main squad.

Reserve teams are also no longer permitted to enter the Copa del Rey. Additionally, only under-23 players or under-25 players with a professional contract can switch between senior and reserve teams.

History
Founded in 1942 as Triana Balompié and named after a working class district in Seville. Legend has it that Betis, later to evolve into Real Betis, was formed in 1913 by a group of Sevilla FC directors after the club refused to sign a player who came from Triana.

In 1976, the team was renamed as Betis Deportivo and started to compile an impressive record in the Spanish U-19 Cup, winning the competition in 1983, 1990, 1998 and 1999, and finishing as runners-up in 1969 and 1992. This record was only bettered by FC Barcelona, Real Madrid and Athletic Bilbao, and Betis were also runners-up in the U-19 league in 1990. 

Betis Deportivo spent the vast majority of its existence in Segunda División B and Tercera División, never reaching the promotion playoffs in the former category.

After being named as Real Betis B between 1991 and 2017, the club recovered the name of Betis Deportivo.

Season to season
As a farm team

As a reserve team

1 season in Primera Federación
25 seasons in Segunda División B
1 season in Segunda Federación
28 seasons in Tercera División

Current squad
.

Reserve team

Out on loan

Technical staff

References

External links
Official website 
B-side on official website 
Futbolme team profile 
La futbolteca team profile 

 

Real Betis
Spanish reserve football teams
Football clubs in Andalusia
Association football clubs established in 1942
1942 establishments in Spain
Primera Federación clubs
Sport in Seville
Football clubs in Spain